Martin "Doc" McKinney (born August 27, 1971) is a Canadian-American record producer and songwriter. McKinney is a Grammy-award-winning producer.  He was formerly one half of the duo (now solo act) Esthero. His work with fellow Toronto artist The Weeknd, whose McKinney-produced mixtapes House of Balloons and Thursday, were freely released in 2011, was met with widespread critical acclaim. McKinney returned to working with The Weeknd on his third album, Starboy, which he executive produced together with him. The album also won him the 2016 Grammy Award for Best Urban Contemporary Album.

Life and career
Born in Canada and raised in Minneapolis, McKinney grew up in the heart of the Twin Cities indie scene and immersed in its ambience. During his adolescent years, McKinney played in various punk rock and hip hop based groups. While the cities' most influential contributions came out of the 1980s, McKinney was immersed in the music scene of that decade.

McKinney settled in Toronto in 1994, as an aspiring producer. McKinney was introduced to Jenny Bea Englishman – now known as "Esthero" – which led him to becoming one half of the then duo. The introduction was headed up by then EMI Publishing President, Michael McCarty. After co-writing and producing their entire breakthrough album Breath From Another, McKinney carefully transitioned Jenny-Bea into a solo act so she could return to the studio. McKinney went on to produce Res – co-writing and producing her critically acclaimed album, HowIDo, alongside Santi White (Santigold). McKinney has since worked with Santi White (Santigold) on various projects, including her 2008 release of her Solid Gold Mixtape.

Since then, McKinney has had the opportunity to work with Sting, Drake, Kelis, Dr. Dre, G-Love, Raphael Saadiq, Mary J. Blige, Sinéad O'Connor, Alice Smith, Amanda Blank, Trouble Andrew, Ali Shaheed Muhammad (A Tribe Called Quest), Hawksley Workman as well as Latin artists Belinda, RBD and Debi Nova.

Personal life
McKinney is a supporter of War Child (charity), GEM's – Girls Educational and Mentoring Services, and Red Hot Organization (AIDS Awareness). As an appreciation of his support, he donates his work as a producer/songwriter/engineer.

Selected production discography

References

1971 births
Living people
American people of Canadian descent
Record producers from Minnesota
Businesspeople from Minneapolis
Grammy Award winners
Songwriters from Minnesota